Andreas Bruus (born 16 January 1999) is a Danish professional footballer who plays as a right-back for  club Troyes. He has also represented Denmark at youth international level.

Career

Brøndby

Youth
Born in Greve Strand, Bruus joined the Brøndby IF youth academy in 2005. He combined this with education at first Krogårdsskolen in his hometown of Greve, and later secondary school at Albertslund Gymnasium together with fellow Brøndby talents Casper Hauervig and Christian Enemark.

On 25 October 2017, Bruus signed his first professional contract with Brøndby IF, a two-and-a-half-year deal which tied him to the club until the summer of 2019. He was included in the first team squad from 1 January 2018. He made his Brøndby debut at the age of 18 when he was brought on for the final ten minutes in the 2–2 home draw against AGF on 10 December 2017.

Loan to Roskilde
Bruus signed a new three-year contract on 31 August 2018 with Brøndby before joining Danish second tier club FC Roskilde on loan until the end of the 2018–19 season. He scored four goals in 24 appearances during his spell, including a brace against Nykøbing FC in a 5–0 away win.

Return to Brøndby
Bruus returned to Brøndby after his loan, but failed to make any appearances during the fall of the 2019–20 season under new manager Niels Frederiksen. In January 2020, he appeared as a right wing-back in friendlies against BK Avarta and Hvidovre IF indicating a new, more defensive role for him in Brøndby after having mostly played as a striker before. He continued in this role in friendlies against Lyngby and Hvidovre, and was called up for the first team in their first match, after the COVID-19 pandemic had suspended the competition, on 2 June 2020 for the match against SønderjyskE. Bruus came on as a substitute for an injured Kevin Mensah with 20 minutes remaining. 

On 19 July, Bruus signed a new contract to keep him at the club until 2023, after having established himself as a starter at the right wing-back position in head coach Frederiksen's 3–5–2 formation. A few months later, on 24 October 2020, Bruus scored his first goal for Brøndby in a 3–2 home loss to Midtjylland.

Bruus made his European debut for the club on 17 August 2022 in a 2–1 away loss to Red Bull Salzburg in the first leg of the play-off round of the UEFA Champions League.

Troyes
Bruus joined Ligue 1 club Troyes on 18 July 2022, signing a five-year contract. He made his competitive debut for the club on 7 August, starting at right-back and providing an assist in a 3–2 away loss to Montpellier. In the following league match against Toulouse, he fell out with a knee injury, sidelining him for the following weeks.

Career statistics

Honours
Brøndby
 Danish Superliga: 2020–21
 Danish Cup: 2017–18

References

External links

1999 births
Living people
People from Greve Municipality
Sportspeople from Region Zealand
Danish men's footballers
Association football fullbacks
Denmark youth international footballers
Danish Superliga players
Danish 1st Division players
Ligue 1 players
Brøndby IF players
FC Roskilde players
ES Troyes AC players
Danish expatriate men's footballers
Danish expatriate sportspeople in France
Expatriate footballers in France